Perani is a village near Tindivanam in Viluppuram district, Tamil Nadu, India, and has a railway station in the south line of Chennai Suburban Railway.

Villages in Viluppuram district